Elections to Chorley Borough Council were held on 5 May 2011.  One third of the council was up for election and the Conservative party lost overall control to NOC.

Council Make-up
After the election, the composition of the council was:

Election result

Results Map

Ward results

Adlington and Anderton

Astley and Buckshaw ward

Chisnall ward

Chorley East ward

Chorley North East ward

Chorley North West ward

N.B. Percentage change in vote is from 2007

Chorley South East ward

Chorley South West ward

Clayton le Woods and Whittle-le-Woods ward

Clayton le Woods North ward

Clayton le Woods West and Cuerden

Coppull ward

Eccleston and Mawdesley ward

Euxton South ward

Lostock ward

2011
2011 English local elections
2010s in Lancashire